Eduard Rosenvald (8 October 1877 Keila Parish, Harju County - ?) was an Estonian politician. He was a member of Estonian Constituent Assembly.

References

1877 births
Members of the Estonian Constituent Assembly
Year of death missing